Gladiator: Sword of Vengeance is a hack and slash video game developed by Acclaim Studios Manchester and published by Acclaim Entertainment for PlayStation 2, Xbox and Microsoft Windows. A GameCube version was cancelled. During development, the game was titled I Gladiator. Throwback Entertainment acquired the rights to several of Acclaim's properties in 2006, including Gladiator: Sword of Vengeance.

On 6 May 2015, during Microsoft's IGNITE conference, it was announced that Gladiator: Sword of Vengeance would be made available on Xbox One and the Windows and Windows Phone stores later in 2015. The game was eventually re-released on the Windows Store on 20 December 2016 for Windows 10, and iOS 10. Stickers for iMessage were released on the App Store on 9 December 2016. On 1 February 2017, Throwback Entertainment brought Gladiator: Sword of Vengeance to the Steam store.

Plot

The game begins as Invictus Thrax (voiced by Sean Pertwee) recounts how the Roman Empire under the reign of noble Emperor Trajan fell into the command of the despotic and sadistic consular, Arruntius (voiced by Chris Jojo), after Trajan's mysterious death. Arruntius ascended to the Imperial throne and brought forth an age of tyranny and destruction for Rome and turned the city of Rome into a personal playground dubbed Arruntium where gladiators fought and died in the streets for Arruntius’ twisted entertainment as its godhead. Thrax describes how he was once the gladiator champion of Trajan before he being sent to fight in the Colosseum by Arruntius to eliminate the last of Trajan's supporters.

Thrax is killed by an unknown force after defeating the other gladiators and is sent to the afterlife of Elysium where he encounters the masked childlike spirits of Romulus and Remus (voiced by James Peter Gale) who reveal to Thrax that Arruntius assassinated Trajan with the aid of black arts from the dark gods of terror and fear and rogue children of Mars, Phobos and Deimos (voiced by Chris Jojo and Jayne Dowell), and used the popular support of bribed senators to take possession of the Imperial Throne. The brother spirits proclaim that Thrax had been chosen by the Roman Gods to act as their champion due to Arruntius’ reign weakening the powers of the gods in order to kill Arruntius, prevent the death of Rome at his hands, and restore the glory of Rome and the Gods. Thrax agrees to act as their champion and travels Elysium with powers gifted from the Gods gained through completing trials to battle and defeat various monsters of myth and the dreaded Phobos and Deimos to recover the life force of Rome, represented by a decayed rendition of the Capitoline Wolf which Thrax helps rebuild after defeating both gods.

Thrax is brought back to life by the brother spirits and fights against Arruntius’ gladiators in the Colosseum before Arruntius decides to murder his daughter Lavinia (voiced by Spomenka Mladenovic) as a sacrifice to resurrect Phobos and Deimos to destroy Thrax. Thrax manages to destroy the dark gods thanks to the powers gifted by the Roman Gods, and finally kills Arruntius by throwing his sword into Arruntius’ chest. Romulus and Remus then appear to congratulate Thrax on his victory before rewarding Thrax his life and his freedom under order of Jupiter. The brother sprits then inform Thrax they may have need of his services again for future battles, but Thrax refuses by asserting his status as a free man and that he would fight for Rome again at a time of his choosing after exploring his new life outside of the life of gladiator. The game ends as Thrax recites passages from “The Coliseum At Rome” by Lord Byron detailing the life and death of gladiators.

Reception

The game received "mixed or average reviews" on all platforms according to video game review aggregator Metacritic.

References

External links

2003 video games
Beat 'em ups
Cancelled GameCube games
PlayStation 2 games
Single-player video games
Throwback Entertainment games
Video games about gladiatorial combat
Video games based on Greek mythology
Video games developed in the United Kingdom
Video games set in the Roman Empire
Windows games
Xbox games